Nuevas Metas is the first studio album recorded by La Factoría. It was released on December 5, 2006.  It contained the hit single "Perdóname".

Track list
"Perdóname" (featuring Eddy Lover) (Mosquera, Vargas)  4:02  
"Como Me Duele" (Mendoza, Miranda, Vargas)  3:14  
"Dale" (Romero)  3:44  
"La Soledad"  (Mendoza, Romero)  3:02  
"Déjame Vivir"  (Machore)  3:46  
"La Pagarás"  (Romero)  3:31  
"Infieles"  (Machore, Romero)  3:09  
"No Pidas Perdón"  (Vargas)  3:35  
"Moriré"  (Mosquera)  3:28  
"Déjalo"  (Mendoza, Romero)  3:17  
"La Noche"  (Romero)  2:50  
"Como Me Duele [Remix]"  (Mendoza, Miranda, Vargas)  3:55
"Perdóname" (featuring Eddy Lover & Adrian Banton) (Mosquera, Vargas, Colin)  4:02 (Only Digital Download)

Charts

Weekly charts

Year-end charts

Singles

Certification

References

La Factoría albums
2006 albums